Matthias Ginsberg (13 July 1949) was a German politician of the Free Democratic Party (FDP) and former member of the German Bundestag.

Life 
Ginsberg moved to the German Bundestag on 9 December 1982. He replaced the mandate of Ingrid Matthäus-Maier.

Literature

References

 1949 births
Members of the Bundestag for North Rhine-Westphalia
Members of the Bundestag 1980–1983
Members of the Bundestag for the Free Democratic Party (Germany)
Living people